Bonnie Dennison (born February 15, 1989) is an American actress. She was born in New York City. From 2002 to 2005, she played Emily Yokas on the NBC television show Third Watch. In 2007, she joined the cast of the long-running CBS daytime drama Guiding Light in the role of Susan "Daisy" Lemay, a role she continued to portray until the end of Guiding Light's broadcast run in 2009.

In 2009, she made a guest appearance in the Ugly Betty episode "Backseat Betty", portraying Ava, a cheerleader at school with Justin. In 2010, she appeared in the movie Stake Land. She has also appeared in commercials for Dannon DanActive, Losethezits.com, and Verizon Wireless.

In 2014, she was cast as one of the leads in a Fox comedy pilot executive produced by Matt Hubbard and Tina Fey, portraying the role of Thena; but the series was later scrapped after a change in management at Fox.

In early 2019, Dennison was cast as Jenny Kenney, the protagonist's daughter in the pilot of the hit CBS series Carol's Second Act starring Patricia Heaton. Following the pilot, Ashley Tisdale replaced Dennison in the role of Jenny (aka she was recast).

Filmography

References

External links

1989 births
American child actresses
American film actresses
American television actresses
Living people
Actresses from New York City
21st-century American actresses